Christiane Cohendy is a French film and theatre actress. She appeared in more than thirty films since 1980.

Selected filmography

Awards
 Molière Award for best actress (1996)

References

External links
 

Living people
Actors from Clermont-Ferrand
French film actresses
French television actresses
French stage actresses
20th-century French actresses
21st-century French actresses
Year of birth missing (living people)